John Keating (born c. 1957) is a Bally Sports Detroit host and reporter. He was born in Madison Heights, Michigan. He attended Grand Valley State University.

In 2019, Keating won his 16th local Emmy from the Michigan chapter of the National Academy of Television Arts and Sciences.

Radio career
Keating began his broadcasting career while a student at Grand Valley State University.  Keating climbed through the ranks of WSRX, Grand Valley's own student run radio station, from broadcaster up to Station Manager. Keating's rise at WSRX led to a job at WZZR, now WLHT, a radio station in nearby Grand Rapids. WZZR already had an on-air personality named "John" on staff.  To avoid confusion among listeners, Keating assumed the on-air name of "Steve Knight."

The move to television 
The job at WZZR led to a job in television at WZZM-TV, also in Grand Rapids.  At WZZM, "Steve" became an on-air fixture and sports favorite in west Michigan.  Having transitioned to television, Keating was stuck being known on air as "Steve Knight". Keating left WZZM in the mid-80s for KMGH in Denver, Colorado, where he worked for a decade. Keating returned to Michigan and worked for the now defunct PASS Sports which was later put out of business by Fox Sports Detroit, who acquired his contract. Among his other roles, he hosts the pregame and postgame shows for the Detroit Tigers and Detroit Red Wings. In June 2009, Keating served as a temporary color analyst on the Detroit Tigers Radio Network for several road games, as regular analyst Jim Price substituted in turn for play-by-play announcer Dan Dickerson while the latter recuperated from leg surgery.

References

External links
Fox Sports Detroit Talent Biographies

Year of birth missing (living people)
Living people
American television sports anchors
Detroit Red Wings announcers
Detroit Tigers announcers
Grand Valley State University alumni
Major League Baseball broadcasters
National Hockey League broadcasters
Sportspeople from Michigan
People from Madison Heights, Michigan